"In My Life" is a song by the English rock band the Beatles. It appeared on their 1965 album Rubber Soul. Its lyrics were written primarily by John Lennon, credited to Lennon–McCartney. George Martin contributed the piano solo bridge.

According to Lennon, "In My Life" was his "first real major piece of work" because it was the first time he wrote about his own life.

In 2000, Mojo named "In My Life" the best song of all time.  Rolling Stone ranked it number 23 on its 2004 list of "The 500 Greatest Songs of All Time", and number 98 on the 2021 revised list, as well as fifth on its list of the Beatles' "100 Greatest Songs".

Lyrics 

In a 1980 interview, Lennon referred to this song as his "first real major piece of work" because it was the first time he had written about his own life. According to Lennon, the song's origins can be traced to English journalist Kenneth Allsop's remark that Lennon should write songs about his childhood. Afterwards, Lennon wrote a song in the form of a long poem reminiscing on those years. The original lyrics were based on a bus route he used to take in Liverpool, naming various sites seen along the way, including Penny Lane and Strawberry Field.

Lennon later thought the original lyrics were "ridiculous", calling it "the most boring sort of 'What I Did on My Holidays Bus Trip' song". He reworked the words and replaced the specific memories with a generalised meditation on his past. Few lines of the original version remained in the finished song. According to Lennon's friend and biographer Peter Shotton, the lines "Some [friends] are dead and some are living/In my life I've loved them all" referred to himself and Stuart Sutcliffe (who died in 1962).

Music

Lennon's and McCartney's recollections differ regarding the music. Lennon said that  McCartney's "contribution melodically was the harmony and the middle-eight." In 1977, when shown a list of songs Lennon claimed writing on for the magazine Hit Parader, "In My Life" was the only entry McCartney disputed. McCartney said he set Lennon's lyrics to music from beginning to end, taking inspiration from songs by Smokey Robinson & the Miracles. In 1976, he commented: "I liked 'In My Life'. Those were words that John wrote, and I wrote the tune to it. That was a great one."

In a 2018 study, artificial intelligence researchers at Harvard University applied bag-of-words modelling to the notes and chords of the song, and concluded that there was a 18.9% probability of McCartney having written the verse. Lennon was given an 81.1% certainty of writing the verses, while McCartney was given a 43.6% certainty of writing the middle eight. The analysts reported "a large amount of uncertainty" regarding the middle eight.

Recording 
The song was recorded on 18 October 1965, and was complete except for the instrumental bridge. At that time, Lennon had not decided what instrument to use, but he subsequently asked George Martin to play a piano solo, suggesting "something Baroque-sounding". Martin wrote a Bach-influenced piece that he found he could not play at the song's tempo. On 22 October, the solo was recorded with the tape running at half speed, so when played back at normal pace the piano was twice as fast and an octave higher, solving the performance challenge and also giving the solo a unique timbre, reminiscent of a harpsichord.

Legacy
"In My Life" inspired pop music producers to use harpsichords in their arrangements. Rolling Stone magazine ranked "In My Life" number 23 on its 2004 list of "The 500 Greatest Songs of All Time", and number 98 on its 2021 list, as well as fifth on its list of the Beatles' "100 Greatest Songs". The song placed second on CBC's 50 Tracks. Mojo magazine named it the best song of all time in 2000. According to Acclaimed Music, as of 2020 it was the 194th most celebrated song in popular music history.

Cover versions 

 Ozzy Osbourne recorded a version for his 1995 album Under Cover. The album included further John Lennon covers, such as Working Class Hero and Woman.
 Siw Malmkvist recorded in Swedish, "I mitt liv" (1970) on her album Underbara Siw (Wonderful Siw), which was awarded a Swedish Grammis the same year.
 George Harrison did a soul-arranged version during his Dark Horse North American tour.
 Bette Midler recorded a version that was released as a single in early 1992 from the soundtrack of her movie For the Boys, It peaked at No. 20 on the Billboard Adult Contemporary chart in the U.S. This version later appeared on her 1993 hits album Experience the Divine: Greatest Hits.  It was also used as background music for a tribute to NASCAR on ABC at the end of the 2000 Brickyard 400 which was the final broadcast of NASCAR on ABC until 2007.
 George Martin produced a version on his 1998 album In My Life, narrated by Sean Connery.
 James Taylor performed the song as a part of the In Memoriam segment at the 82nd Academy Awards.
 In 2012, Lennon's first wife, Cynthia, recorded the song to mark her 72nd birthday and for The Beatles Complete on Ukulele, an ongoing project to cover every Beatles song on (or at least including) a ukulele.
 Canadian singer Chantal Kreviazuk covered the song in 1999, as the theme song for the American TV series Providence.
 The Tallest Man on Earth recorded a version for his 2022 album of cover songs, Too Late for Edelweiss.

Personnel 
Per Ian MacDonald:
 John Lennon – double-tracked vocal, rhythm guitar
 Paul McCartney – harmony vocal, bass
 George Harrison – harmony vocal, lead guitar
 Ringo Starr – drums, bells
 George Martin – piano, tambourine

Charts

Certifications

References

External links

 
Early handwritten draft manuscript of In My Life written by John Lennon at the British Library
 

1965 songs
1960s ballads
Songs about nostalgia
Songs about old age
Baroque pop songs
Bette Midler songs
Bonnie Tyler songs
Cilla Black songs
Johnny Cash songs
Oliver (singer) songs
Ozzy Osbourne songs
Pop ballads
Rock ballads
Songs written by Lennon–McCartney
Song recordings produced by George Martin
Songs published by Northern Songs
The Beatles songs